Guercœur is an opera in three acts by the French composer Albéric Magnard to his own libretto. It was first performed posthumously at the Paris Opéra on 24 April 1931, though it had mostly been written between 1897 and 1901. The composer died trying to save his house from the invading Germans at the beginning of World War I in 1914 and the score was partially destroyed in the resulting fire. Magnard's friend Guy Ropartz reconstructed the missing sections so the opera could be staged. The music shows the strong influence of Wagner.

The opera received its first staging for over 80 years when it was produced in Osnabrück in June 2019 with Rhys Jenkins in the title role, conducted by Andreas Hotz.

Roles

Synopsis
Guercœur, the wise ruler of a medieval city-state, has died in battle defending his people. In Heaven, he begs to be allowed to return to earth to save his city. His wish is granted but he finds his best friend, Heurtal, has become the lover of his widow, Giselle, and is planning to rule as a despot after marrying her. Shocked, Guercœur attempts to convince the people to reject corruption, but they become increasingly angry with him, and in the end he is murdered. Disillusioned with humanity, he returns to heaven, where he is greeted by the Goddess of Truth. She assures him that despite human weaknesses, a great age of humanity lies ahead.

Recordings
 1951 Bernard Demigny, Marcelle Bunlet, Fernand Faniard; orchestra and chorus conducted by Tony Aubin (Bourg, 1985)
 1986 José van Dam, Hildegard Behrens, Gary Lakes, Nadine Denize, Orfeón Donostiarra, Toulouse Capitole Orchestra, conducted by Michel Plasson (EMI, 1987)

Sources

Penguin Guide to Opera on Compact Discs (1993)
Viking Opera Guide ed. Holden (Viking, 1993) 

Compositions by Albéric Magnard
French-language operas
1931 operas
Operas
Lost operas
Operas completed by others